Sergey Zhinkarenko is a Soviet sprint canoer who competed in the late 1970s. He won a silver medal in the K-4 500 m event at the 1979 ICF Canoe Sprint World Championships in Duisburg.

References

Living people
Soviet male canoeists
Year of birth missing (living people)
Russian male canoeists
ICF Canoe Sprint World Championships medalists in kayak